Mahamane is a given name. Notable people with the name include:

 Mahamane Cissé (born 1993), Nigerien football player
 Mahamane Haidara (1910–1981), Malian politician
 Mahamane Kalil Maiga (born 1948), Malian scientist and politician
 Mahamane Ousmane (born 1948), Nigerien politician, fourth President of Niger
 Mahamane Saley, Nigerien politician
 Mahamane Traoré (born 1988), Malian football midfielder